Miguel Dellavalle (December 1898 – 22 November 1932) was an Argentine footballer. He played in eight matches for the Argentina national football team from 1920 to 1922. He was also part of Argentina's squad for the 1920 South American Championship.

References

External links
 

1898 births
1932 deaths
Argentine footballers
Argentina international footballers
Place of birth missing
Association football midfielders
Club Atlético Belgrano footballers